Camarosporula is a genus of fungi in the class Dothideomycetes. The relationship of this taxon to other taxa within the class is unknown (incertae sedis). This is a monotypic genus, consisting of the single species Camarosporula persooniae. Teleomorph synonyms — Anthracostroma persooniae.

a 2011 study conducted by the NIH found evidence that "Camarosporula appears to represent a distinct genus within this (sic: Teratosphaeriaceae) family".

See also 
 List of Dothideomycetes genera incertae sedis

References

External links 
 Index Fungorum

Dothideomycetes enigmatic taxa
Monotypic Dothideomycetes genera